Ranielle Damaceno Ribeiro (born 25 August 1979) is a Brazilian professional football manager, currently in charge of Santa Cruz.

Career
Born in Natal, Rio Grande do Norte, Ribeiro was a futsal player for hometown sides América de Natal and ABC before retiring. He later became a fitness coach at his last club, being also an interim manager on several occasions between 2011 and 2017.

Ribeiro was definitely appointed manager of ABC on 29 November 2017, for the ensuing campaign. He was dismissed on 13 May 2019, and took over Lagarto on 24 October of that year.

Ribeiro left Lagarto on 6 March 2020, as the club ended their activities for the season. He was named in charge of Anápolis on 18 November, but resigned the following 29 March.

On 20 April 2021, Ribeiro was appointed manager of Série D side Campinense. On 17 November, after achieving promotion to the Série C, he renewed his contract for a further year.

Ribeiro was sacked by Campinense on 3 July 2022, with the club in the relegation zone of the 2022 Série C.

Honours
Campinense
Campeonato Paraibano: 2022

References

External links

1979 births
Living people
People from Natal, Rio Grande do Norte
Brazilian men's futsal players
Brazilian football managers
Campeonato Brasileiro Série B managers
Campeonato Brasileiro Série C managers
Campeonato Brasileiro Série D managers
ABC Futebol Clube managers
Anápolis Futebol Clube managers
Campinense Clube managers
Sportspeople from Rio Grande do Norte
Santa Cruz Futebol Clube managers